Carl Herman "Dutch" Diehl (May 2, 1904 – November 13, 1997) was an American college football player. 

He was a consensus All-American in 1924 and 1925. He helped Dartmouth win the college football national championship in 1925.

Diehl was one of several members of Dartmouth's undefeated 1925 team who returned to campus in January 1963 to honor the undefeated 1962 team. A member of the class of 1926, Diehl was inducted to the Dartmouth athletics hall of fame (the "wearers of the green") in 1984. Diehl was living in Catonsville, Maryland, at the time of his death in 1997; he was survived by his wife and four children.

References

1904 births
1997 deaths
Players of American football from Chicago
American football guards
Dartmouth Big Green football players
All-American college football players